The 5th Circuit de Cadours was a Formula Two motor race held on 30 August 1953 at the Circuit de Cadours, in Cadours, Tarn-et-Garonne, France. The race, consisting of 2x10 lap heats, a 10 lap repechage and a 30 lap final, was won by Maurice Trintignant in a Gordini Type 16. Trintignant's teammates Harry Schell and Jean Behra finished second and third, with Schell setting fastest lap.

Classification

Race

References

Cadours
Cadours